Bilohorivka may refer to:

 Bilohorivka, Donetsk Oblast, a village in the Donetsk Oblast in Ukraine
 Bilohorivka, a former village in the Donetsk Oblast in Ukraine that was disestablished in 2008
 Bilohorivka, Luhansk Oblast, a village in the Luhansk Oblast in Ukraine
 , a village in the Rivne Oblast in Ukraine

See also 
 Belogorovka, the Russian name for all of these villages and the name of two other villages in Russia